Baratang Island is an island of the Andaman Islands. It belongs to the North and Middle Andaman administrative district, part of the Indian union territory of Andaman and Nicobar Islands.

History
Ranchiwalas Island is another name for Baratang Island. Towards the close of the nineteenth century, the city of Ranchi experienced political upheaval. Many locals sought refuge by converting to Christianity with the help of the missionaries there. The British, realizing the future prospects of the forests of Andaman and Nicobar islands, sent the converts to Baratang Island to cultivate crops. The laborers from Ranchi settled there and made new lives for themselves. 
A lighthouse was commissioned in 1985 at the eastern entrance to the Andaman strait.

Geography
The island belongs to the Great Andaman Chain, and with an area of  it is one of the main islands of the group, a closely set archipelago in the Bay of Bengal, adjoining the Andaman Sea. Middle Andaman is to its north, and South Andaman to the south. Beaches, mangrove creeks, limestone caves, and mud volcanoes are some of the physical features. The islands of Ritchie's Archipelago lie  to the east. Baratang contains the only known examples of mud volcanoes in India. These mud volcanoes have erupted sporadically, with recent eruptions in 2005 believed to have been associated with the 2004 Indian Ocean earthquake. The previous major eruption recorded was on 18 February 2003. The locals call this mud volcano jalki.
There are other volcanoes in the area, the Barren Island volcano which is the only active volcano in South Asia, and the Narcondum volcano which has been classified as a dormant volcano by the Geological Survey of India.

Administration
Administratively, Baratang Island is part of Rangat Taluk.
Forest area of island is managed by DFO, Baratang.

Transportation
The island is dissected by the Andaman Trunk Road to Rangat and Mayabunder. There are two ferry crosses: "Bamboo Trikery" Jetty and "Nilambur" Jetty.

Demographics 
There are a twelve villages on Baratang, most noted are Adazig, Sunderghar, Nayaghar and Nilambur(HQ). 
According to the 2011 census of India, the Island has 5691 inhabitants. The effective literacy rate (i.e. the literacy rate of population excluding children aged 6 and below) is 100%.

This island is inhabited mainly by the migrated Chota Nagpuri tribes.

Tourism
Major attractions on the island include the limestone caves, the Mud Volcano, Parrot Island, and Baludera Beach.

Places to Stay include the APWD inspection bungalow, Guest House of Forest Department as well as some hotels viz., Dew Dale Resorts and Coral Creek Resort.

Image gallery

References

External links

 Geological Survey of India
 

Islands of North and Middle Andaman district
Tourist attractions in the Andaman and Nicobar Islands
Volcanoes of India
Volcanoes of the Indian Ocean
Mud volcanoes